The Women's javelin throw at the 1952 Olympic Games took place on 24 July at the Helsinki Olympic Stadium. Czech athlete Dana Zátopková won the gold medal and set a new Olympic record.

Records
Prior to this competition, the existing world and Olympic records were as follows.

The following record was set during this competition.

Results

Qualifying round

Qualification: Qualifying Performance 38.00 m advance to the Final.

Final

References

External links
Official Olympic Report, la84.org.

Athletics at the 1952 Summer Olympics
Javelin throw at the Olympics
1952 in women's athletics
Women's events at the 1952 Summer Olympics